Harry Graydon Shriver  (September 2, 1896 – January 21, 1970), nicknamed "Pop", was a pitcher in Major League Baseball. He pitched for the Brooklyn Robins during the 1922 and 1923 baseball seasons. He attended West Virginia Wesleyan College.

External links

1896 births
1970 deaths
Baseball players from West Virginia
Major League Baseball pitchers
Brooklyn Robins players
West Virginia Wesleyan Bobcats baseball players
People from Monongalia County, West Virginia
Providence Grays (minor league) players
Saginaw Aces players
Clarksburg Generals players